Glyphostoma pustulosa is a species of sea snail, a marine gastropod mollusk in the family Clathurellidae.

Description
The shell grows to a length of  12 mm.

Distribution
This species occurs in the Pacific Ocean along the Galápagos Islands and Cocos Island, Costa Rica

References

External links
 

pustulosa
Gastropods described in 1971